Out and About is an album by Cherish the Ladies that was released in 1993 on the Green Linnet label.

Track listing
 "The Old Favorite/The Flogging Reel/Leave My Way/The Kerryman" – 4:20
 "Spoon River" – 4:44
 "The Ladies of Carrick/The Kinnegad Slashers/Old Man Dillon" – 3:54
 "Declan's Waltz/Waltz Duhamel" – 4:28
 "The Cameronian Set: Tha M'Intinn Raoir/Duke of Gordon/The Cameronian/Lady of the House" – 5:25
 "Inisheer" – 3:00
 "O'Keefe's/The Shepherd's Lamb/Johnny O'Leary's" – 3:31
 "Roisin Dubh – The Small Black Rose" – 3:13
 "Le Voyage de Camouret/House of Hamill" – 4:37
 "The Cat Rambles to the Child's Saucepan/Maire O'Keefe/Harry Bradshaw's" – 3:18
 "The Missing Piece" – 4:14
 "The Out and About Set: The Wandering Minstrel/Fred Rice's Polka/The Cabin Hunter/Out and About" – 5:09

References

External links
 Complete identification of album contents at irishtune.info

Cherish the Ladies albums
1993 albums